Burghead Thistle Football Club are a Scottish football team, based in Burghead, Moray. Members of the Scottish Junior Football Association, they currently play in the North Second Division of the SJFA North Region.

The club were formed in 1889. In early 1906 they became founder members of the Elginshire Junior League, later known as the Morayshire Junior League from 1906–07 season. They became the first club outside Elgin to become League Champions in 1908–09 season, they took the title again the following season 1909–10.

Home matches are played at Forest Park just outside Burghead. The team play in green shirts and shorts. The club are managed by David MacDonald

External links
Club website

Burghead
Association football clubs established in 1889
Football clubs in Scotland
Scottish Junior Football Association clubs
Football in Moray
1889 establishments in Scotland